Chapuis-Dornier was a French manufacturer of proprietary engines for automobiles from 1904 to 1928 in Puteaux near Paris. Between 1919 and 1921 it displayed a prototype automobile, but it was never volume produced.

Engine manufacture
Chapuis-Dornier engines were used by cyclecars such as : 

Able, 
A.S. (Voiturettes Automobiles A.S), 
A.S. (Towarzystwo Budowy Samochodów), (article)
Benjamin, 
B.N.C. (Bollack Netter and Co), 
C.A.R. (Costruzioni Automobili Riuniti), (article) 
Classic (Compagnie Générale des Voitures à Paris), (article)
Corre La Licorne, 
Delage
Derby, (article)
Doriot, Flandrin & Parant (D.F.P.), 
Doriot-Flandrin, 
Dupressoir (article)
Fadin (Fabbrica Automobili Officine Trubetzkoy), (article)
Automobiles Favier (article)
Fordinette (J. Depreux) (article)
Fox, (article)
G.A.R. (Verza Automobili), (article)
G.A.R. (Gardahaut), (article)
Gobron, 
Gobron-Brillié
G.N.L. (Newey)
Gordon Newey 
I.E.N.A. (Industria Economica Nazionale Automobili di Tommasi & Rizzi), 
Induco (Automobiles Induco), 
Kevah (Kévah)
La Gazelle, (article) 
Le Gui, (article) 
Le Roll, (article) 
Louvet, (article)  
Madou, (article)  
Marguerite, (article)
Marshall-Arter  (article) 
Meldi, (Officine Meccanica Giuseppe Meldi) (article)
MS, (article)
Newey 
O.P., (article) 
Patri, (article) 
Rabœuf, (article) 
Automobiles Rally, 
Reyrol, (article) 
Sidéa, (Société Industrielle des Automobiles Sidéa) (article) 
SAM, (Società Automobili e Motori) (article) 
Sénéchal (article) 
S.P.A.G. (article) 
Speidel, (article)
S.U.P.  (article)
TAM, (article)
Tic-Tac, (F. Dumoulin) (article)
Tuar, (Garage Moderne) (article)
Vaillant (Cyclecars Vaillant) (article)
Zévaco. (SA des Voiturettes et Cyclecars) (article)

Automobile manufacture
Between 1919 and 1921 Chapuis-Dornier displayed a prototype automobile at the Paris salons, equipped with a 3-litre, four cylinder engine, but this never resulted in volume production.

References

David Culshaw & Peter Horrobin: The Complete Catalogue of British Cars 1895-1975. Veloce Publishing plc. Dorchester (1997). 

Defunct motor vehicle manufacturers of France
Cyclecars
Auto parts suppliers of France
French companies established in 1904